The 2016 Nevada Republican presidential caucuses took place on February 23 in the U.S. state of Nevada, marking the Republican Party's fourth nominating contest in their series of presidential primaries ahead of the 2016 presidential election.

With the Democratic Party having already held its Nevada caucuses three days earlier on February 20, the Republican caucus in Nevada was the only presidential primary on that day.

During the 2015 legislative session, lawmakers attempted to change the caucus into a regular primary and at a much earlier date, however the bill failed to advance to a vote.

Candidates 
Nine candidates were eligible:
Jeb Bush (dropped out)
Ben Carson
Chris Christie (dropped out)
Ted Cruz
Carly Fiorina (dropped out)
Jim Gilmore (dropped out)
John Kasich
Marco Rubio
Donald Trump

Debates and forums

December 15, 2015 – Las Vegas, Nevada

The fifth debate was held on December 15, 2015, at the Venetian Resort in Las Vegas, Nevada.  It was the second debate to air on CNN, and was also broadcast by Salem Radio. The debate was moderated solely by Wolf Blitzer with Dana Bash and Hugh Hewitt serving alongside as questioners.

The debate was split into primetime and pre-primetime groups based on averaged polling numbers; in order to participate in the main debate, candidates had to meet one of three criteria in polls conducted between October 29 and December 13 which were recognized by CNN—either an average of at least 3.5% nationally, or at least 4% in either Iowa or New Hampshire. The secondary debate featured candidates that had reached at least 1% in four separate national, Iowa, or New Hampshire polls that are recognized by CNN. Paul was included in the main debate after not qualifying under the original rules because he received 5% support in Iowa in a Fox News poll.

The debate lineup was announced on December 13 to include Trump, Cruz, Rubio, Carson, Bush, Fiorina, Christie, Paul, and Kasich in the primetime debate, and Huckabee, Santorum, Graham, and Pataki in the undercard debate. Commentators suggested that the key confrontation would be between Trump and Cruz, based on their respective polling in Iowa.

Eighteen million people watched the debate, making it the third-largest audience ever for a presidential primary debate. During the debate, the audible coughing was attributed to Ben Carson. His campaign admitted that they all got sick a month prior and Carson had kept the cough for weeks. The cough was "almost gone" and Carson was not really sick at the time.

The undercard debate was the fourth and final debate appearance of Senator Lindsey Graham and former Governor George Pataki, who suspended their campaigns on December 21 and December 29, respectively.

Endorsements 

Having been swept into numerous offices in the previous election, many new Nevada Republican officeholders came out in support of various candidates. Notably, there were splits among different groups of Republicans towards their endorsements. Legislators who had supported a controversial tax hike during the 2015 session came out in support of Jeb Bush and Marco Rubio, while those who opposed it supported Rand Paul, Ted Cruz or Donald Trump.

(Note: This list contains endorsements only for candidates who were still running at the time of the caucuses)

Polling

Aggregate polls

Results
Primary date: February 23, 2016
County conventions: March 12 - April 2, 2016 (presumably)
State convention: May 7–8, 2016 (presumably)
National delegates: 30

Delegates were awarded to candidates who got more than 3.33% of the vote proportionally.

Donald Trump received more votes than the combined total of the 2012 Nevada caucuses, while also beating Mitt Romney's previous two records.  On the eve of the caucuses, Trump stopped by Palo Verde High School in Summerlin to greet voters.

Results by county

Analysis 
Donald Trump overwhelmingly won the caucuses, with Marco Rubio, who for a time lived in Nevada, coming in a distant second. According to exit polls by Edison Research, Trump won among ideologically moderate (50%) and somewhat conservative (55%) voters. Trump carried white caucus-goers with 47% and Latino caucus-goers with 45%.

Ted Cruz won two counties, Elko and Nye, the latter of which has a large LDS population. Mormon voters continued to be a strong constituency for Cruz throughout the primary.

References

Nevada
Republican presidential caucuses
2016